Surveyor General of Pakistan is the Head of Survey of Pakistan, a National Mapping Organisation working under the Ministry of Defense of the Government of Pakistan. The Surveyors General of Pakistan had been coming from civil as well as military setups. According to parliament approval, at present Surveyor General of Pakistan is a serving Major General coming from Army Corps of Engineers. Major General Saeed Akhtar, HI(M) is the current Surveyor General of Pakistan.

List of Surveyors General

References

See also
Survey of Pakistan

Pakistani government officials
Pakistani military appointments